Prince of Yuzhang may refer to:

Emperor Huai of Jin (284–313), known as Prince of Yuzhang before he took the throne
Xiao Ni (444–492), Liang dynasty prince
Xiao Dong (died 552), Liang dynasty emperor, known as Prince of Yuzhang before he took the throne